Calem Nieuwenhof (born 17 February 2001), is an Australian professional footballer who plays as a central midfielder for Western Sydney Wanderers.

Professional career
On 19 November 2020 he made his professional debut with Sydney FC in a 2020 AFC Champions League clash against Shanghai SIPG. 
He scored his first goal for Sydney FC against Wellington Phoenix on 2 January 2021. In 2022 he joined Western Sydney Wanderers signing a two year contract. He scored his first goal for Western Sydney Wanderers on 19 February 2023, in a 4-4 draw with Adelaide United.

References

External links

2001 births
Living people
Australian soccer players
Association football midfielders
Sydney FC players
National Premier Leagues players
Australian people of Dutch descent